Count Imre Cseszneky de Milvány et Csesznek (1804-1874) was a Hungarian agriculturist and patriot, born in 1804 to the impoverished Bácska branch of the Cseszneky family. In the 1830s he served as lieutenant. Later he became a talented agriculturist landowner in Szabadka area, who following the steps of Count István Széchenyi gained distinction by developing Hungarian horse breeding. 

Cseszneky was the patron of the notable poet, Pál Jámbor (Hiador) and - following the advice of Lajos Kossuth - the advocate of Mihály Vörösmarty's election in the Bácsalmás electoral district to the parliament. 

In 1848 he supported with his fortune the establishment of the National Guard (Nemzetőrség) and the Defence Forces of Bácska, in which his brother fought at Csantavér against the Serbian rebels. 

Due to his role in the Hungarian Revolution of 1848 he suffered serious reprisal under the Serbian Voivodship.

Sources 
 Bácskai katonai összeírás
 Cseszneky család
 Reiszig Ede: Bács-Bodrog vármegye története

1804 births
1874 deaths
People of the Revolutions of 1848
Hungarian Revolution of 1848
Agriculturalists
Counts of Hungary
Imre
People from Subotica